Roger Savage is an Australian sound engineer who was nominated for an Academy Award in the category Best Sound for the film Moulin Rouge!.

After moving from England to Australia in 1964, he engineered some of the most important Australian popular music recordings of the period, including classic tracks by The Twilights, MPD Ltd, The Masters Apprentices and Spectrum, as well as innumerable radio and TV commercials.

Savage began to concentrate on film work in the 1970s. One of his earliest film credits was as an audio engineer on Getting Back to Nothing, Tim Burstall's documentary of the 1970 World Surfing Championships staged at Bells Beach, Victoria. He has worked on over 80 films since 1971 and in 2001 he was awarded the Australian Centenary Medal for his services to Australian society and to Australian film production.

Selected filmography
 Moulin Rouge! (2001)
 Shine (1996)
 Babe (1995)
 Return of the Jedi (1983)
 The Pirate Movie (1982)

References

External links

Year of birth missing (living people)
Living people
Australian audio engineers
Best Sound BAFTA Award winners